Mardekheh (also Romanized as Mardakheh; also known as Mardakhe) is a village in Jirdeh Rural District, in the Central District of Shaft County, Gilan Province, Iran. At the 2006 census, its population was 888, in 233 families.

References 

Populated places in Shaft County